Janina Kraupe-Świderska (January 27, 1921 - March 3, 2016) was a Polish painter and printmaker.
A native of Sosnowiec, Kraupe-Świderska was associated for much of her career with the avant-garde of Kraków, especially the group which had formed around the city's Kunstgewerbeschule during World War II; eventually she numbered Tadeusz Kantor, Tadeusz Brzozowski, and Jerzy Nowosielski among her acquaintances. From 1957 she belonged to the Grupa Krakowska. She studied at the Academy of Fine Arts, Kraków, eventually returning to the institution as a lecturer and professor and remaining on the faculty until 1980. A 1997 print by Kraupe-Świderska is owned by the National Gallery of Art, and she is represented in the collection of the Olomouc Museum of Art.

References

1921 births
2016 deaths
Polish women painters
Polish printmakers
Women printmakers
20th-century Polish painters
20th-century printmakers
21st-century Polish women artists
20th-century Polish women artists
21st-century Polish painters
21st-century printmakers
People from Sosnowiec
Jan Matejko Academy of Fine Arts alumni
Academic staff of the Jan Matejko Academy of Fine Arts